Tigerspike is a software company headquartered in Sydney. It was founded in 2003 by Luke Janssen, Oliver Palmer, and Dean Jezard. Tigerspike was acquired by Concentrix in 2017, and rebranded as Concentrix Tigerspike in 2020.

History

Tigerspike was founded in 2003 in Sydney, Australia. In 2008, Tigerspike opened its Innovation Lab, which focuses on new technologies, including encryption and compression. The lab is headed by Oliver Palmer.

In 2011, Tigerspike secured a US$ 11 million investment from Aegis Group. The same year, Tigerspike was featured on Forbes’ list of America’s Most Promising Companies and expanded into Singapore.

Tigerspike released Karacell, a quantum computing encryption technology designed for mobile devices in 2012.

In July 2017, Tigerspike became part of Concentrix, a business services company and a wholly owned subsidiary of SYNNEX Corporation (NYSE: SNX).

In November 2020, Tigerspike announced that it was changing its operating name to Concentrix Tigerspike.

Products

Concentrix Tigerspike has designed and developed applications for print media companies such as The Economist and Haaretz. Their cloud-based service platform is used by clients including Pepsi, Vodafone and the World Wide Fund for Nature. The company also developed the ICSA Blueprint BoardPad app, an enterprise app used for board meetings and agenda for 71 of the FTSE 100 companies.

See also

Cross Platform
Service Delivery Platform
Quantum Cryptography

References

Further reading
Future Tech Report: PC market will die in 2015
Trends in mobile technology: the next decade
How far ahead can you plan for a business?
BYOD an opportunity for NZ businesses
Tapping into apps to transform business

External links
Official site

Companies established in 2003